The Department of Agriculture (abbreviated as DA) is the executive department of the Philippine government responsible for the promotion of agricultural and fisheries development and growth. It has its headquarters at Elliptical Road corner Visayas Avenue, Diliman, Quezon City.

The department is currently led by the secretary of agriculture, nominated by the president of the Philippines and confirmed by the Commission on Appointments. The secretary is a member of the Cabinet. The current secretary is Bongbong Marcos, who assumed office on June 30, 2022 in concurrent capacity as President.

History
The Department of Agriculture had its spiritual beginnings when President Emilio Aguinaldo of the Revolutionary Government of the Philippines established the Department of Agriculture and Manufacturing on June 23, 1898. Jose Alejandrino was appointed the first secretary.

American colonial government
In 1901, under the American colonial government, priority was given to the development of other agricultural products, such as rice and other basic commodities, as well as fishing, forestry, and mining. This new focus necessitated the establishment of the Insular Bureau of Agriculture. This bureau was put under the Department of the Interior through Act No. 271 of the Philippine Legislature, and was later put under the supervision of the Department of Public Instruction in 1910.

The first Filipino to head the Bureau of Agriculture was Adriano Hernández, himself a practicing farmer.

The Bureau of Agriculture grew rapidly until it was abolished by the enactment of Act No. 2666, otherwise known as An Act to Re-organize the Executive Department of the Government of the Philippine Islands, on November 18, 1916, and was implemented on January 1, 1917. This act provided for the establishment of the Department of Agriculture and Natural Resources (DANR), which would take over direct executive control, direction, and supervision of the Bureaus of Agriculture, Forestry, Lands, Science, and Weather, as well as all matters concerning hunting, fisheries, sponges and other sea products, and such others as may be assigned to it by law.

By virtue of another reorganization (as per Act No. 4007) in 1932, the DANR became the Department of Agriculture and Commerce. The Bureau of Commerce, which used to be under the Department of Commerce and Communication, was placed under the reorganized department.

In 1942, while the Commonwealth government was in exile, the department was re-organized again, becoming the Department of Finance, Agriculture and Commerce. Upon the resumption of the commonwealth in February 1945, it became the Department of Justice, Agriculture and Commerce, and then back to being the Department of Agriculture and Commerce in December the same year.

Post-independence
In 1947, the agriculture department was renamed again as the Department of Agriculture and Natural Resources by virtue of Executive Order No. 94. The Bureau of Commerce, among others, was incorporated to the newly created Department of Commerce and Industry.

On September 14, 1959, the DANR moved to its current building in Diliman, Quezon City from the Agrifina Circle (now the Teodoro Valencia Circle) in Manila.

By virtue of Presidential Decree No. 461, the DANR was split in May 1974 into two departments: the Department of Agriculture and the Department of Natural Resources (now the DENR).

After the shift to the parliamentary system in 1978, all departments were changed to ministries. Thus, the office became the Ministry of Agriculture and Food until 1987, when the office’s name was reverted to the Department of Agriculture by Executive Order No. 116.

The same executive order mandated the DA to promote agricultural development by providing the policy framework, public investment, and support services, which are needed for domestic and export-oriented business enterprises. Guided by the principle that agriculture is business, the DA implemented policy and institutional reforms that freed the agriculture markets, enabling farmers to enjoy higher farmgate prices. These reforms included the dismantling of agricultural monopolies and the elimination of agricultural taxes. Reforms of the agricultural credit system, such as the phase-out of the direct lending scheme, were also initiated.

In May 2014, pursuant to Executive Order No. 165, four agencies representing three-quarters of the DA's budget — the Fertilizer and Pesticide Authority, the National Food Authority, the National Irrigation Administration, and the Philippine Coconut Authority — were removed from DA control. This was part of the anti-corruption reforms which followed the pork barrel scam. The four agencies are now direct subjects of the Office of the President, where they are overseen by the Presidential Assistant for Food Security and Agricultural Modernization.

List of Secretaries of Agriculture

Organizational structure
The department is headed by the Secretary of Agriculture, with the following undersecretaries and assistant secretaries:
Senior Undersecretary
Undersecretary for Administration and Finance
Undersecretary for Operations
Undersecretary for Policy, Planning, Research and Regulation
Undersecretary for Special Concerns
Assistant Secretary for Agribusiness
Assistant Secretary for Administration
Assistant Secretary for Finance
Assistant Secretary for Operations
Assistant Secretary for Fisheries
Assistant Secretary for Livestock
Assistant Secretary for Policy
Assistant Secretary for Planning and Project Development
Assistant Secretary for Regulations

Under the Office of the Secretary are the following offices and services:
 Administrative Service
 Agribusiness and Marketing Assistance Service
 Field Operations Service
 Financial and Management Service
 Information and Communications Technology Service
 Internal Audit Service
 Legal Service
 Planning Service
 Policy Research Service
 Project Development Service

A regional executive director is assigned to each of the 17 regions of the Philippines.

Bureaus
The DA is composed of eight bureaus, namely:
 Agricultural Training Institute (ATI)
 Bureau of Agriculture and Fisheries Standards (BAFS), formerly known as Bureau of Agricultural and Fisheries Product Standards (BAFPS) until the enactment of R.A. No. 10601.
  Bureau of Animal Industry (BAI)
 Bureau of Agricultural Research (BAR)
 Bureau of Fisheries and Aquatic Resources (BFAR)
 Bureau of Plant Industry (BPI)
 Bureau of Soils and Water Management (BSWM)
 Bureau of Agricultural and Fisheries Engineering (BAFE), new bureau under R.A. No. 10601

Formerly-attached bureaus:
 Bureau of Agricultural Statistics (BAS) (now under the Philippine Statistics Authority)

Attached agencies
The following agencies, corporations and councils are attached to the DA for policy and program coordination:
 Agricultural Credit and Policy Council (ACPC)
 Philippine Fiber Industry Development Authority (PhilFIDA)
 National Dairy Authority (NDA)
 National Fisheries Research and Development Institute (NFRDI)
 National Meat Inspection Service (NMIS)
 National Tobacco Administration (NTA)
 Philippine Carabao Center (PCC)
 Philippine Council for Agriculture and Fishery (PCAF)
 Philippine Center for Postharvest Development and Mechanization (PHilMech)
 Philippine Fisheries Development Authority (PFDA)
 Philippine Rice Research Institute (Philrice)
 Southeast Asian Fisheries Development Center (SEAFDEC)
 Sugar Regulatory Administration (SRA)
 Fertilizer and Pesticide Authority (FPA)
 National Food Authority (NFA)
 Philippine Coconut Authority (PCA)
 National Irrigation Administration (NIA)
 Philippine Crop Insurance Corporation (PCIC)

Formerly-attached agencies:
 Cotton Development Administration (CODA) (merged with Fiber Industry Development Authority)
 Philippine Crop Insurance Corporation (PCIC) (transferred to Department of Finance)

See also

 Department of Agrarian Reform
 Land reform in the Philippines

General:
 Agriculture in the Philippines

References

 
Agricultural organizations based in the Philippines
1898 establishments in the Philippines
Philippines, Agriculture
Agriculture ministries
Agriculture